Henry McCauley Farm is a historic farm complex located at Hagerstown, Washington County, Maryland, United States. The house is a four-bay, two-story brick dwelling built between 1830 and 1850, with a four bay ell and a small one-story shed-roofed addition. The walls are set on low limestone foundations.  The property also includes a large stone and frame bank barn and a metal windmill for pumping water. It is one of two historic farm complexes located in Ditto Farm Regional Park, along with Ditto Knolls.

The Henry McCauley Farm was listed on the National Register of Historic Places in 1976.

References

External links
, including photo from 1974, at Maryland Historical Trust

Houses on the National Register of Historic Places in Maryland
Houses in Hagerstown, Maryland
Houses completed in 1790
National Register of Historic Places in Washington County, Maryland